Gleb Olegovich Pisarevskiy (born 28 June 1976 in Arkhangelsk) is a Russian weightlifter who won the bronze medal in the 105 kg class at the 2004 Summer Olympics.

References

External links 

 iat.uni-leipzig.de

1976 births
Living people
Russian male weightlifters
Weightlifters at the 2004 Summer Olympics
Olympic weightlifters of Russia
Olympic bronze medalists for Russia
Olympic medalists in weightlifting
Medalists at the 2004 Summer Olympics
European Weightlifting Championships medalists
Sportspeople from Arkhangelsk
20th-century Russian people
21st-century Russian people